Plesiotethina is a genus of beach flies, insects in the family Canacidae (formally Tethinidae). The only known species, Plesiotethina australis, has been described from Australia .

Species
P. australis Munari, 2000

References

Canacidae
Carnoidea genera